Craig Alan Woodman (born 22 December 1982) is an English professional footballer who plays as a defender for Tiverton Town

Playing career

Bristol City 

Woodman began his career with Bristol City as a trainee, turning professional in June 2000. His first team debut came on 5 December 2000 in the Football League Trophy defeat away to Plymouth Argyle. His league debut came on 24 February 2001, in a 4–0 defeat away to Colchester United.

He struggled to establish himself at City and in September 2004 joined Mansfield Town on loan, scoring his first professional goal there in a game against Notts County.

In December 2004 he joined Torquay United on loan making 22 appearances and scoring 1 goal against Colchester United. His goal came on the last day of the season but could not prevent his side losing 2-1 and being relegated.

Woodman returned to Torquay on loan in November 2005. Woodman made just four appearances before being recalled by Bristol City. Woodman scored his first and only goal for Bristol City in April 2006 against Tranmere Rovers.

Woodman was released from his contract at Bristol City on 9 May 2007. He signed with League Two side Wycombe Wanderers two weeks later.

Wycombe Wanderers 

Woodman was a key player during the team's promotion season in 2008/09, missing just ten minutes of league action all year. His good form was rewarded when he won the Supporters' Player of the Year and the Players' Player of the Year awards at the end of the season.

Woodman was named the club captain in January 2010 following the release of Michael Duberry. Woodman retained his captaincy until March when manager Gary Waddock replaced him with Adam Hinshelwood.

Brentford 

On 30 June 2010, Woodman moved to Brentford for an undisclosed fee. Woodman made 79 appearances and scored 2 goals for The Bees during his two seasons at Griffin Park; his two goals coming against Cheltenham Town in a League Cup tie and against Peterborough United in the league.

Exeter City 

Woodman signed for League Two side Exeter City in July 2012 on a free transfer after his contract with Brentford was terminated by mutual consent. He has gone on to play over 250 games for the Grecians, and following Jordan Tillson's departure in January 2020, is currently the longest-serving player at the club. His first and only league goal for the Grecians came in 2014, when he netted a 30-yard thunderbolt free kick against Scunthorpe United to help Exeter avoid relegation from the Football League. Woodman was released by Exeter at the end of his contract in July 2020 after struggling with injury during the season, making only 3 league appearances in the 19/20 campaign.

Tiverton Town 
Woodman signed for Southern League side and hometown club Tiverton Town on the 8th August 2020.

Career statistics

Honours

Club 

 Wycombe Wanderers
 League Two Third Place (Promoted): 2008–09

References

External links

1982 births
Living people
Sportspeople from Tiverton, Devon
Footballers from Devon
English footballers
Association football defenders
Bristol City F.C. players
Mansfield Town F.C. players
Torquay United F.C. players
Wycombe Wanderers F.C. players
Brentford F.C. players
Exeter City F.C. players
Tiverton Town F.C. players
English Football League players